Marcelo Ryan Silvestre dos Santos (born 8 June 2002) is a Brazilian footballer who currently plays as a forward for Yokohama FC.

Career statistics

Club

Notes

References

2002 births
Living people
People from Aracaju
Brazilian footballers
Association football forwards
Campeonato Brasileiro Série A players
Associação Desportiva Confiança players
Esporte Clube Bahia players
Sportspeople from Sergipe